The Cornigliese or Corniglio is an Italian breed of domestic sheep from the Apennines of the province of Parma, in Emilia–Romagna in central Italy. It is raised in the provinces of Bologna, Ferrara, Modena, Parma, Ravenna and Reggio Emilia.

History

The Cornigliese breed was created in the mid-eighteenth century by the Borboni of Parma by crossing the local Vissana breed with Spanish merinos to improve the quality of the wool, at that time the most important attribute of sheep. In the early twentieth century, the weight was increased by intromission of Bergamasca blood. The Cornigliese is one of the forty-two autochthonous local sheep breeds of limited distribution for which a herdbook is kept by the Associazione Nazionale della Pastorizia, the Italian national association of sheep-breeders.

The conservation status of the Cornigliese was listed as "endangered" by the FAO in 2007. Between 2000 and 2014 total numbers recorded for the breed fell steadily from 2179 to 1369.

References

Sheep breeds originating in Italy